The Cass Fjord Formation is a geologic formation in Greenland. It preserves fossils dating back to the Ordovician period. The Cass Fjord is a geographic feature at the northern end of Peabody Bay on the eastern side of the Kane Basin in northwestern Greenland.

See also

 List of fossiliferous stratigraphic units in Greenland

References

Ordovician Greenland